The 2013 Cincinnati Reds season was the 124th season for the franchise in Major League Baseball, and their 11th at Great American Ball Park. During the 2013 season, the Reds returned to the playoffs for a second straight season, after a 97–65 season in 2012, in which they lost in 5 games in the NLDS. On September 23, due to the Washington Nationals' loss to the St. Louis Cardinals, the Reds clinched a spot in the post-season. They entered the playoffs as a Wild Card team, becoming the first team to qualify for the postseason after finishing third in their respective division. They lost in the 2013 National League Wild Card Game to the Pittsburgh Pirates.

Notable offseason acquisitions/roster moves
December 11, 2012: As part of a three-team deal with the Arizona Diamondbacks and the Cleveland Indians, the Reds sent Didi Gregorius to Arizona and traded outfielder Drew Stubbs to Cleveland for outfielder Shin-Soo Choo and infielder Jason Donald and cash.  
December 13, 2012: Signed infielder Jack Hannahan as a free agent.
December 20, 2012: Signed outfielder Derrick Robinson as a free agent.
January 14, 2013: Signed infielder César Izturis as a free agent.
January 17, 2013: Signed pitcher Armando Galarraga as a free agent.

Standings

National League Central

National League Wild Card

Record vs. opponents

Regular season

Detailed record

Most Runs Scored in a game: 15 (4/5 vs. Washington)
Most Runs Allowed in a game: 12 (6/5 vs. Colorado)
Longest Winning Streak: 6 Games (5/10-5/16)
Longest Losing Streak: 5 Games (4/9-4/14)

Game log

|- style="text-align:center; background:#fbb;"
| 1 || April 1 || Angels || FSO || L 1–3 (13) || Lowe (1–0) || Hoover (0–1) || Frieri (1) || 43,168 || 0–1 || 
|- style="text-align:center; background:#bfb;"
| 2 || April 3 || Angels || FSO || W 5–4 || Chapman (1–0) || Downs (0–1)  || || 35,257 || 1–1 || 
|- style="text-align:center; background:#bfb;"
| 3 || April 4 || Angels || FSO || W 5–4 || Arroyo (1–0) || Blanton (0–1) || Chapman (1) || 23,795 || 2–1 || 
|- style="text-align:center; background:#bfb;"
| 4 || April 5 || Nationals || FSO || W 15–0 || Bailey (1–0) || Haren (0–1) || || 28,102 || 3–1 || 
|- style="text-align:center; background:#fbb;"
| 5 || April 6 || Nationals || FSO || L 6–7 (11) || Stammen (1–0) || Hoover (0–2) ||  || 34,762 || 3–2 || 
|- style="text-align:center; background:#bfb;"
| 6 || April 7 || Nationals || FSO || W 6–3 || Cueto (1–0) || Strasburg (1–1) || Chapman (2) || 32,514 || 4–2 || 
|- style="text-align:center; background:#bfb;"
| 7 || April 8 || @ Cardinals || FSO || W 13–4 || LeCure (1–0) || Boggs (0–1) || || 47,345 || 5–2 || 
|- style="text-align:center; background:#fbb;"
| 8 || April 9 || @ Cardinals || FSO || L 1–5 || Lynn (1–0) || Arroyo (1–1) || || 37,731 || 5–3 || 
|- style="text-align:center; background:#fbb;"
| 9 || April 10 || @ Cardinals || FSO || L 0–10 || Westbrook (1–1) || Bailey (1–1) || || 34,882 || 5–4 || 
|- style="text-align:center; background:#fbb;"
| 10 || April 12 || @ Pirates || FSO || L 5–6 || Watson (1–0) || Hoover (0–3) || Grilli (4) || 24,366 || 5–5 || 
|- style="text-align:center; background:#fbb;"
| 11 || April 13 || @ Pirates || FSO || L 1–3 || Locke (1–1) || Simón (0–1) || Grilli (5) || 25,118 || 5–6 || 
|- style="text-align:center; background:#fbb;"
| 12 || April 14 || @ Pirates || FSO || L 7–10 || Hughes (1–0) || Broxton (0–1) || || 19,239 || 5–7 || 
|- style="text-align:center; background:#bfb;"
| 13 || April 15 || Phillies || ESPN || W 4–2 || Arroyo (2–1)  || Horst (0–1) || Chapman (3) || 17,345 || 6–7 || 
|- style="text-align:center; background:#bfb;"
| 14 || April 16 || Phillies || FSO || W 1–0 || Chapman (2–0) || Aumont (1–2) || || 15,544 || 7–7 || 
|- style="text-align:center; background:#bfb;"
| 15 || April 17 || Phillies || ESPN2 || W 11–2 || Leake (1–0) || Lannan (0–1) || || 16,467 || 8–7 || 
|- style="text-align:center; background:#bfb;"
| 16 || April 18 || Marlins || FSO || W 11–1 || Cingrani (1–0) || Fernández (0–1) || || 14,916 || 9–7 || 
|- style="text-align:center; background:#fbb;"
| 17 || April 19 || Marlins || FSO || L 1–2 || Dunn (1–0) || Chapman (2–1) || Cishek (1) || 26,112 || 9–8 || 
|- style="text-align:center; background:#bfb;"
| 18 || April 20 || Marlins || FSO || W 3–2 (13)|| Simón (1–1)  || Cishek (1–2) || || 35,645 || 10–8 || 
|- style="text-align:center; background:#bfb;"
| 19 || April 21 || Marlins || FSO || W 10–6 || Ondrusek (1–0) || Sanabia (2–2) || || 28,882 || 11–8 || 
|- style="text-align:center; background:#bfb;"
| 20 || April 22 || Cubs || FSO || W 5–4 (13) || Simón (2–1) || Bowden (0–1) || || 18,090 || 12–8 || 
|- style="text-align:center; background:#fbb;"
| 21 || April 23 || Cubs  || FSO || L 2–4 (10) || Mármol (1–0) || Parra (0–1) || Gregg (1) || 24,021 || 12–9 || 
|- style="text-align:center; background:#bfb;"
| 22 || April 24 || Cubs || MLBN || W 1–0 || Latos (1–0) || Samardzija (1–4) || Chapman (4) || 16,426 || 13–9 || 
|- style="text-align:center; background:#fbb;"
| 23 || April 25 || @ Nationals || FSO || L 1–8 || Gonzalez (2–1) || Arroyo (2–2) || || 24,748 || 13–10 || 
|- style="text-align:center; background:#fbb;"
| 24 || April 26 || @ Nationals || FSO || L 0–1 || Zimmermann (4–1) || Bailey (1–2) || || 32,995 || 13–11 || 
|- style="text-align:center; background:#fbb;"
| 25 || April 27 || @ Nationals || Fox || L 3–6 || Haren (2–3) || Leake (1–1) || Soriano (7) || 38,903 || 13–12 || 
|- style="text-align:center; background:#bfb;"
| 26 || April 28 || @ Nationals || FSO || W 5–2 || Cingrani (2–0) || Detwiler (1–2) || Chapman (5) || 36,457 || 14–12 || 
|- style="text-align:center; background:#bfb;"
| 27 || April 29 || @ Cardinals || FSO || W 2–1 || Latos (2–0) || Wainwright (4–2) || Chapman (6) || 36,381 || 15–12 || 
|- style="text-align:center; background:#fbb;"
| 28 || April 30 || @ Cardinals || FSO || L 1–2 || García (3–1)  || Arroyo (2–3)  || Mujica (5) || 37,535 || 15–13 || 
|-

|- style="text-align:center; background:#fbb;"
| 29 || May 1 || @ Cardinals || FSO || L2–4 || Lynn (5–0) || Bailey (1–3) || Mujica (6) || 39,821|| 15–14 || 
|- style="text-align:center; background:#bfb;"
| 30 || May 3 || @ Cubs || FSO || W 6–5 || Leake (2–1) || Villanueva (1–2) || Hoover (1) || 32,579 || 16–14 || 
|- style="text-align:center; background:#bfb"
| 31 || May 4 || @ Cubs || FSO || W 6–4 || Ondrusek (2–0) || Mármol (2–2) || Chapman (7) || 36,455 || 17–14 || 
|- style="text-align:center; background:#bfb"
| 32 || May 5 || @ Cubs || FSO || W 7–4 || Latos (3–0) || Jackson (0–5) || Hoover (2) || 33,449 || 18–14 || 
|- style="text-align:center; background:#fbb;"
| 33 || May 6 || Braves || FSO || L 4–7 || Maholm (4–3) || Arroyo (2–4) || Kimbrel (10) || 19,308 || 18–15 || 
|- style="text-align:center; background:#bfb"
| 34 || May 7 || Braves || FSO || W 5–4 || Broxton (1–1) || Kimbrel (0–1) || || 25,730 || 19–15 || 
|- style="text-align:center; background:#fbb;"
| 35 || May 8 || Braves || MLBN || L 2–7 || Minor (4–2) || Leake (2–2) || || 36,640 || 19–16 || 
|- style="text-align:center; background:#bfb"
| 36 || May 10 || Brewers || FSO || W 4–3 || Simón (3–1) || Gallardo (3–2) || Chapman (8) || 33,251 || 20–16 || 
|- style="text-align:center; background:#bfb"
| 37 || May 11 || Brewers || FSO || W 13–7 || Latos (4–0) || Burgo (1–1) || || 41,678 || 21–16 || 
|- style="text-align:center; background:#bfb"
| 38 || May 12 || Brewers || FSO || W 5–1 || Arroyo (3–4) || Peralta (1–1) || || 38,813 || 22–16 || 
|- style="text-align:center; background:#bfb"
| 39 || May 14 || @ Marlins || FSO || W 6–2 || Bailey (2–3) || Nolasco (2–5) || || 14,694 || 23–16 || 
|- style="text-align:center; background:#bfb"
| 40 || May 15 || @ Marlins || FSO || W 4–0 || Leake (3–2) || Sanabia (2–6) || || 14,866 || 24–16 || 
|- style="text-align:center; background:#bfb"
| 41 || May 16 || @ Marlins || FSO || W 5–3 (10)|| Chapman (3–1) || Cishek (1–4) || Hoover (3) || 16,680 || 25–16 || 
|- style="text-align:center; background:#fbb;"
| 42 || May 17 || @ Phillies || FSO || L 3–5 || De Fratus (2–0) || Marshall (0–1) || Papelbon (8) || 43,129 || 25–17 || 
|- style="text-align:center; background:#bfb"
| 43 || May 18 || @ Phillies || Fox || W 10–0 || Arroyo (4–4) || Kendrick (4–2) || || 41,817 || 26–17 || 
|- style="text-align:center; background:#fbb;"
| 44 || May 19 || @ Phillies || FSO || L 2–3 || Bastardo (2–1) || Chapman (3–2) ||  || 41,009 || 26–18 || 
|- style="text-align:center; background:#bfb"
| 45 || May 20 || @ Mets || FSO || W 4–3 || Cueto (2–0) || Marcum (0–5) || Chapman (9) || 23,038 || 27–18 || 
|- style="text-align:center; background:#bfb"
| 46 || May 21 || @ Mets || FSO || W 4–0 || Leake (4–2) || Niese (3–5) || || 23,183 || 28–18 || 
|- style="text-align:center; background:#bfb"
| 47 || May 22 || @ Mets || FSO || W 7–4 || Simón (4–1) || Parnell (4–1) || Chapman (10) || 30,415 || 29–18 || 
|- style="text-align:center; background:#bfb"
| 48 || May 24 || Cubs || FSO || W 7–4 || Arroyo (5–4) || Feldman (4–4) || Chapman (11) || 40,716 || 30–18 || 
|- style="text-align:center; background:#bfb"
| 49 || May 25 || Cubs || FSO || W 5–2 || Bailey (3–3) || Wood (4–3)  || Chapman (12) || 40,909 || 31–18 || 
|- style="text-align:center; background:#fbb;"
| 50 || May 26 || Cubs || FSO || L 4–5 || Gregg (1–0) || Hoover (0–4) || || 41,321 || 31–19 || 
|- style="text-align:center; background:#bfb"
| 51 || May 27 || Indians || FSO || W 4–2 || Broxton (2–1) || Hagadone (0–1)  || Chapman (13) || 38,822 || 32–19 || 
|- style="text-align:center; background:#bfb"
| 52 || May 28 || Indians || FSO || W 8–2 || Latos (5–0) || McAllister (4–4) || || 28,812 || 33–19 || 
|- style="text-align:center; background:#fbb;"
| 53 || May 29 || @ Indians || FSO || L 2–5 || Masterson (8–3) || Arroyo (5–5) || || 18,004 || 33–20 || 
|- style="text-align:center; background:#fbb;"
| 54 || May 30 || @ Indians || FSO || L 1–7 || Kazmir (3–2) || Bailey (3–4) || || 18,364 || 33–21 || 
|- style="text-align:center; background:#bfb"
| 55 || May 31 || @ Pirates || FSO || W 6–0 || Cueto (3–0) || Rodríguez (6–3) || || 35,730 || 34–21 || 
|-

|- style="text-align:center; background:#bfb"
| 56 || June 1 || @ Pirates || Fox || W 2–0 || Leake (5–2) || Liriano (3–2) || Chapman (14) || 33,912 || 35–21 || 
|- style="text-align:center; background:#fbb;"
| 57 || June 2 || @ Pirates || FSO || L 4–5 (11) || Wilson (5–0) || Simón (4–2) || || 29,407 || 35–22 || 
|- style="text-align:center; background:#bfb"
| 58 || June 3 || Rockies || FSO || W 3–0 || Arroyo (6–5) || Chatwood (3–1) || Chapman (15) || 18,498 || 36–22 || 
|- style="text-align:center; background:#fbb;"
| 59 || June 4 || Rockies || FSO || L 4–5 || Outman (2–0) || LeCure (1–1) || Brothers (2) || 27,031 || 36–23 || 
|- style="text-align:center; background:#fbb;"
| 60 || June 5 || Rockies || FSO || L 4–12 || Garland (4–6) || Villarreal (0–1) || || 26,665 || 36–24 || 
|- style="text-align:center; background:#fbb;"
| 61 || June 7 || Cardinals || FSO || L 2–9 || Wainwright (9–3) || Leake (5–3) || || 38,874 || 36–25 || 
|- style="text-align:center; background:#bfb"
| 62 || June 8 || Cardinals || Fox || W 4–2 || Latos (6–0) || Lyons (2–2) || Chapman (16) || 40,740 || 37–25 || 
|- style="text-align:center; background:#fbb;"
| 63 || June 9 || Cardinals || ESPN || L 4–11 (10) || Rosenthal (1–0) || Hoover (0–5) || || 38,023 || 37–26 || 
|- style="text-align:center; background:#bfb"
| 64 || June 10 || @ Cubs || FSO || W 6–2 || Bailey (4–4) || Feldman (5–5) || || 28,052 || 38–26 || 
|- style="text-align:center; background:#bfb"
| 65 || June 11 || @ Cubs || FSO || W 12–2 || Cingrani (3–0) || Garza (1–1) || || 30,937 || 39–26 || 
|- style="text-align:center; background:#bfb"
| 66 || June 12 || @ Cubs || FSO || W 2–1 || Leake (6–3) || Wood (5–5) || Chapman (17) || 24,749 || 40–26 || 
|- style="text-align:center; background:#fbb;"
| 67 || June 13 || @ Cubs || FSO || L 5–6 (14)|| Rondon (1–0) || Broxton (5–5) || || 28,986 || 40–27 || 
|- style="text-align:center; background:#bfb"
| 68 || June 14 || Brewers || FSO || W 4–3 (10)|| Simón (5–2) || Badenhop (0–3) || || 35,138 || 41–27 || 
|- style="text-align:center; background:#fbb;"
| 69 || June 15 || Brewers || FSO || L 0–6 || Gallardo (6–6) || Bailey (4–5) || || 37,519 || 41–28 || 
|- style="text-align:center; background:#bfb"
| 70 || June 16 || Brewers || FSO || W 5–1 || Cueto (4–0) || Peralta (4–8) || || 39,088 || 42–28 || 
|- style="text-align:center; background:#bfb"
| 71 || June 17 || Pirates || FSO || W 4–1 || Leake (7–3) || Liriano (5–3) || Chapman (18) || 28,892 || 43–28 || 
|- style="text-align:center; background:#fbb;"
| 72 || June 18 || Pirates || FSO || L 0–4 || Morton (1–1) || Latos (6–1) || || 28,993 || 43–29 || 
|- style="text-align:center; background:#bfb"
| 73 || June 19 || Pirates || FSO || W 2–1 (13) || Parra (1–1) || Mazzaro (3–2) || || 36,567 || 44–29 || 
|- style="text-align:center; background:#fbb;"
| 74 || June 20 || Pirates || FSO || L 3–5 || Morris (4–2) || Simón (5–3)  || Watson (2) || 40,929 || 44–30 || 
|- style="text-align:center; background:#fbb;"
| 75 || June 21 || @ Diamondbacks || FSO || L 5–11 || Harris (1–0) || Cueto (4–1) || || 27,819 || 44–31 || 
|- style="text-align:center; background:#fbb;"
| 76 || June 22 || @ Diamondbacks || Fox || L 3–4 || Ziegler (4–1) || Chapman (3–3) || || 30,567 || 44–32 || 
|- style="text-align:center; background:#bfb"
| 77 || June 23 || @ Diamondbacks || FSO || W 4–2 || Latos (7–1) || Delgado (0–1) || Chapman (19) || 30,723 || 45–32 || 
|- style="text-align:center; background:#fbb;"
| 78 || June 25 || @ Athletics || FSO || L 3–7 || Neshek (2–1) || Arroyo (6–6) || || 17,506 || 45–33 || 
|- style="text-align:center; background:#fbb;"
| 79 || June 26 || @ Athletics || FSO || L 0–5 || Griffin (6–6) || Bailey (4–6) || || 25,658 || 45–34 || 
|- style="text-align:center; background:#fbb;"
| 80 || June 28 || @ Rangers || FSO || L 0–4 || Pérez (2–1) || Cueto (4–2) || || 41,218 || 45–35 || 
|- style="text-align:center; background:#bfb"
| 81 || June 29 || @ Rangers || Fox || W 6–4 (11) || Hoover (1–5) || McClellan (0–1) || Chapman (20) || 44,397 || 46–35 || 
|- style="text-align:center; background:#fbb;"
| 82 || June 30 || @ Rangers || FSO || L 2–3 || Darvish (8–3) || Latos (7–2) || Nathan || 39,078 || 46–36 || 
|-

|- style="text-align:center; background:#bfb"
| 83 || July 1 || Giants || FSO || W 8–1 (6)|| Arroyo (7–6) || Kickham (0–3) || || 30,702 || 47–36 || 
|- style="text-align:center; background:#bfb"
| 84 || July 2 || Giants || FSO || W 3–0 || Bailey (5–6) || Lincecum (4–9) || || 27,509 || 48–36 || 
|- style="text-align:center; background:#bfb"
| 85 || July 3 || Giants || FSO || W 3–2 (11) || Hoover (2–5) || Lopez (1–1) || || 40,757 || 49–36 || 
|- style="text-align:center; background:#bbb"
| – || July 4 || Giants || colspan=8 | Postponed (rain);  Makeup: July 23 @SF
|- style="text-align:center; background:#fbb;"
| 86 || July 5 || Mariners || FSO || L 2–4 || Harang (4–7) || Leake (7–4) || Pérez (2) || 33,596 || 49–37 || 
|- style="text-align:center; background:#bfb"
| 87 || July 6 || Mariners || FSO || W 13–4 || Latos (8–2) || Bonderman (1–3) || || 34,965 || 50–37 || 
|- style="text-align:center; background:#fbb;"
| 88 || July 7 || Mariners || FSO || L 1–3 || Saunders (7–8) || Arroyo (7–7) || Wilhelmsen (18) || 32,669 || 50–38 || 
|- style="text-align:center; background:#fbb;"
| 89 || July 8 || @ Brewers || FSO || L 3–4 || Lohse (5–6) || Bailey (5–7) || Rodríguez (9) || 25,341 || 50–39 || 
|- style="text-align:center; background:#fbb;"
| 90 || July 9 || @ Brewers || FSO || L 0–2 || Peralta (6–9) || Cingrani (3–1) || || 25,369 || 50–40 || 
|- style="text-align:center; background:#bfb"
| 91 || July 10 || @ Brewers || FSO || W 6–2 || Leake (8–4) || Hellweg (0–3) || || 35,239 || 51–40 || 
|- style="text-align:center; background:#fbb;"
| 92 || July 11 || @ Braves || FSO || L 5–6 || Hudson (6–7) || Latos (8–3) || Kimbrel (25) || 40,186 || 51–41 || 
|- style="text-align:center; background:#bfb"
| 93 || July 12 || @ Braves || FSO || W 4–2 || Arroyo (8–7) || Medlen (6–9) || Chapman (21) || 43,275 || 52–41 || 
|- style="text-align:center; background:#fbb;"
| 94 || July 13 || @ Braves || FSO || L 2–5 || Minor (9–4) || Bailey (5–8) || Kimbrel (26) || 46,946 || 52–42 || 
|- style="text-align:center; background:#bfb"
| 95 || July 14 || @ Braves || FSO || W 8–4 || Ondrusek (3–0) || Teherán (7–5) || || 29,846 || 53–42 || 
|- style="text-align:center;"
| colspan="11" style="background:#bbcaff;"|July 16: 2013 MLB All-Star Game – New York City, New York at Citi Field (AL 3, NL 0)
|- style="text-align:center; background:#bfb"
| 96 || July 19 || Pirates || FSO || W 5–3 || Leake (9–4) || Liriano (9–4) || Chapman (22) || 40,831 || 54–42 || 
|- style="text-align:center; background:#bfb"
| 97 || July 20 || Pirates || Fox || W 5–4 || Latos (9–3) || Burnett (4–7) || Chapman (23) || 34,728 || 55–42 ||
|- style="text-align:center; background:#fbb;"
| 98 || July 21 || Pirates || FSO || L 2–3 || Locke (9–2) || Bailey (5–9) || Grilli (30) || 40,824 || 55–43 ||
|- style="text-align:center; background:#bfb"
| 99 || July 22 || @ Giants || FSO || W 11–0 || Arroyo (9–7) || Lincecum (5–10) || || 41,797 || 56–43 ||
|- style="text-align:center; background:#bfb"
| 100 || July 23 || @ Giants || FSO || W 9–3 || Cingrani (4–1) || Surkamp (0–1) || ||  || 57–43 || 
|- style="text-align:center; background:#fbb;"
| 101 || July 23 || Giants|| FSO || L 3–5 || Casilla (4–2) || Reynolds (0–1) || Romo (24) || 42,310 || 57–44 || 
|- style="text-align:center; background:#bfb"
| 102 || July 24 || @ Giants || FSO || W 8–3 || Leake (10–4) || Gaudin (4–2) || || 41,512 || 58–44 || 
|- style="text-align:center; background:#bfb"
| 103 || July 25 || @ Dodgers || FSO || W 5–2 || Latos (10–3) || Greinke (8–3) || Chapman (24) || 53,275 || 59–44 || 
|- style="text-align:center; background:#fbb"
| 104 || July 26 || @ Dodgers || FSO || L 1–2 || Kershaw (10–6) || Bailey (5–10) || Jansen (13) || 51,841 || 59–45 || 
|- style="text-align:center; background:#fbb"
| 105 || July 27 || @ Dodgers || FSO || L 1–4 || Ryu (9–3) || Arroyo (9–8) || Jansen (14) || 52,675 || 59–46 || 
|- style="text-align:center; background:#fbb"
| 106 || July 28 || @ Dodgers || FSO || L 0–1 || League (6–3) || Partch (0–1) || || 48,671 || 59–47 || 
|- style="text-align:center; background:#fbb"
| 107 || July 29 || @ Padres || FSO || L 1–2 || Gregerson (5–5) || Chapman (3–4) || || 24,050 || 59–48 || 
|- style="text-align:center; background:#fbb"
| 108 || July 30 || @ Padres || FSO || L 2–4 || Thayer (1–3) || Parra (1–2) || Street (20) || 29,207 || 59–49 || 
|- style="text-align:center; background:#bfb"
| 109 || July 31 || @ Padres || FSO || W 4–1 || Bailey (6–10) || Stults (8–10) || Chapman (25) || 26,450 || 60–49 || 
|-

|- style="text-align:center; background:#fbb"
| 110 || August 2 || Cardinals || FSO || L 3–13 || Miller (11–7) || Arroyo (9–9) || || 39,095 || 60–50 ||  
|- style="text-align:center; background:#bfb"
| 111 || August 3 || Cardinals || FSO || W 8–3 || Cingrani (5–1) || Westbrook (7–6) || || 41,598 || 61–50 ||   
|- style="text-align:center; background:#fbb"
| 112 || August 4 || Cardinals || FSO || L 2–15 || Lynn (13–5) || Leake (10–5) || || 39,618 || 61–51 || 
|- style="text-align:center; background:#bfb"
| 113 || August 6 || Athletics || FSO || W 3–1 || Latos (11–3) || Straily (6–6) || Chapman (26) || 34,640 || 62–51 || 
|- style="text-align:center; background:#bfb"
| 114 || August 7 || Athletics || || W 6–5 || Bailey (7–10) || Colón (14–4) || Chapman (27) || 29,746 || 63–51 || 
|- style="text-align:center; background:#bfb"
| 115 || August 9 || Padres || FSO || W 7–2 || Arroyo (10–9) || Cashner (8–6) || || 30,288 || 64–51 || 
|- style="text-align:center; background:#fbb"
| 116 || August 10 || Padres || FSO || L 1–3 || Ross (3–5) || Cingrani (5–2) || Street (22) || 34,777 || 64–52 || 
|- style="text-align:center; background:#bfb"
| 117 || August 11 || Padres || FSO || W 3–2 (13) || LeCure (2–1) || Stauffer (1–1) || || 38,567 || 65–52 || 
|- style="text-align:center; background:#bfb"
| 118 || August 12 || @ Cubs || FSO || W 2–0 || Latos (12–3) || Wood (7–9) || Chapman (28) || 33,277 || 66–52 || 
|- style="text-align:center; background:#bfb"
| 119 || August 13 || @ Cubs || FSO || W 6–4 (11) || Hoover (3–5) || Sánchez (0–1) || Chapman (29) || 33,286 || 67–52 || 
|- style="text-align:center; background:#bfb"
| 120 || August 14 || @ Cubs || FSO || W 5–0 || Arroyo (11–9) || Rusin (2–2) || || 33,642 || 68–52 || 
|- style="text-align:center; background:#bfb"
| 121 || August 15 || @ Brewers || FSO || W 2–1 || Cingrani (6–2) || Lohse (8–8) || Chapman (30) || 36,076 || 69–52 || 
|- style="text-align:center; background:#fbb"
| 122 || August 16 || @ Brewers || FSO || L 6–7 || Axford (6–6) || Chapman (3–5) || || 33,037 || 69–53 || 
|- style="text-align:center; background:#fbb"
| 123 || August 17 || @ Brewers || FSO || L 0–2 || Gallardo (9–9) || Latos (12–4) || Henderson (18) || 37,046 || 69–54 || 
|- style="text-align:center; background:#bfb"
| 124 || August 18 || @ Brewers || FSO || W 9–1 || Bailey (8–10) || Peralta (8–13) || || 34,175 || 70–54 || 
|- style="text-align:center; background:#bfb"
| 125 || August 19 || Diamondbacks || FSO || W 5–3 || Arroyo (12–9) || Delgado (4–4) || Chapman (31) || 20,349 || 71–54 || 
|- style="text-align:center; background:#fbb"
| 126 || August 20 || Diamondbacks || FSO || L 2–5 || Corbin (13–3) || Cingrani (6–3) || || 20,092 || 71–55 || 
|- style="text-align:center; background:#bfb"
| 127 || August 21 || Diamondbacks || FSO || W 10–7 || Leake (11–5) || McCarthy (2–8) || Chapman (32) || 23,297 || 72–55 || 
|- style="text-align:center; background:#bfb"
| 128 || August 22 || Diamondbacks ||  || W 2–1 || Latos (13–4) || De La Rosa (0–1) || LeCure (1) || 21,166 || 73–55 || 
|- style="text-align:center; background:#fbb"
| 129 || August 23 || Brewers || FSO || L 4–6 || Wooten (2–0) || Simón (5–4) || Henderson (20) || 34,230 || 73–56 || 
|- style="text-align:center; background:#bfb"
| 130 || August 24 || Brewers || FSO || W 6–3 || Arroyo (13–9) || Axford (6–7) || Chapman (33) || 33,430 || 74–56 || 
|- style="text-align:center; background:#fbb"
| 131 || August 25 || Brewers || FSO || L 1–3 || Estrada (6–4) || Reynolds (0–2) || Henderson (21) || 33,743 || 74–57 || 
|- style="text-align:center; background:#fbb"
| 132 || August 26 || @ Cardinals || FSO || L 6–8 || Martinez (1–1) || Parra (1–3) || Mujica (35) || 35,159 || 74–58 || 
|- style="text-align:center; background:#fbb"
| 133 || August 27 || @ Cardinals || FSO || L 1–6 || Kelly (6–3) || Latos (13–5) || || 35,201 || 74–59 || 
|- style="text-align:center; background:#bfb"
| 134 || August 28 || @ Cardinals || FSO || W 10–0 || Bailey (9–10) || Wainwright (15–8) || || 35,698 || 75–59 || 
|- style="text-align:center; background:#fbb"
| 135 || August 30 || @ Rockies || FSO || L 6–9 || de la Rosa (15–6) || Arroyo (13–10) || || 29,415 || 75–60 || 
|- style="text-align:center; background:#bfb"
| 136 || August 31 || @ Rockies || FSO || W 8–3 || Reynolds (1–2) || Nicasio (8–7) || || 37,616 || 76–60 || 
|-

|- style="text-align:center; background:#fbb"
| 137 || September 1 || @ Rockies || FSO || L 4–7 || Ottavino (1–2) || Leake (11–6) || || 30,594 || 76–61 || 
|- style="text-align:center; background:#bfb"
| 138 || September 2 || Cardinals || FSO || W 7–2 || Latos (14–5) || Wainwright (15–9) || || 32,951 || 77–61 ||  
|- style="text-align:center; background:#bfb"
| 139 || September 3 || Cardinals || FSO || W 1–0 || Bailey (10–10) || Maness (5–2) || Chapman (34) || 20,219 || 78–61 || 
|- style="text-align:center; background:#fbb"
| 130 || September 4 || Cardinals || FSO || L 4–5 (16) || Martinez (2–1) || Ondrusek (3–1) || || 23,894 || 78–62 || 
|- style="text-align:center; background:#bfb"
| 141 || September 5 || Cardinals || FSO || W 6–2 || Cingrani (7–3) || Lynn (13–10) || || 21,418 || 79–62|| 
|- style="text-align:center; background:#bfb"
| 142 || September 6 || Dodgers || FSO || W 3–2 || Leake (12–6) || Howell (2–1) || Chapman (35) || 33,778 || 80–62 || 
|- style="text-align:center; background:#bfb"
| 143 || September 7 || Dodgers || Fox || W 4–3 (10) || Hoover (4–5) || Wilson (1–1) || || 40,799 || 81–62|| 
|- style="text-align:center; background:#bfb"
| 144 || September 8 || Dodgers || ESPN || W 3–2 || Chapman (4–5) || Belisario (5–7) || || 34,041 || 82–62|| 
|- style="text-align:center; background:#fbb"
| 145 || September 9 || Cubs || FSO || L 0–2 || Wood (9–11) || Arroyo (13–11) || Gregg (31) || 22,920 || 82–63 || 
|- style="text-align:center; background:#fbb"
| 146 || September 10 || Cubs || FSO || L 1–9 || Jackson (8–15) || Cingrani (7–4) || || 21,396 || 82–64 || 
|- style="text-align:center; background:#bfb"
| 147 || September 11 || Cubs ||  || W 6–0 || Leake (13–6) || Samardzija (8–12) || || 22,088 || 83–64|| 
|- style="text-align:center; background:#fbb"
| 148 || September 13 || @ Brewers || FSO || L 1–5 || Lohse (10–9) || Latos (14–6) || || 39,665 || 83–65 ||  
|- style="text-align:center; background:#bfb"
| 149 || September 14 || @ Brewers || Fox || W 7–3 || Bailey (11–10) || Hellweg (1–4) || Chapman (36) || 25,929 || 84–65|| 
|- style="text-align:center; background:#fbb"
| 150 || September 15 || @ Brewers || FSO || L 5–6 || Henderson (4–5) || Duke (1–2) || || 26,725 || 84–66 ||  
|- style="text-align:center; background:#bfb"
| 151 || September 16 || @ Astros || FSO || W 6–1|| Cueto (5–2) || Bédard (4–11) || || 15,449 || 85–66|| 
|- style="text-align:center; background:#bfb"
| 152 || September 17 || @ Astros || FSO || W 10–0 || Leake (14–6) || Lyles (7–8) || || 25,582 || 86–66|| 
|- style="text-align:center; background:#bfb"
| 153 || September 18 || @ Astros || FSO || W 6–5 (13) || Simón (6–4) || De Leon (0–1) || Chapman (37) || 29,701 || 87–66 || 
|- style="text-align:center; background:#bfb"
| 154 || September 20 || @ Pirates || FSO || W 6–5 (10) || Hoover (5–5) || Farnsworth (3–1) || Chapman (38) || 37,940 || 88–66 || 
|- style="text-align:center; background:#fbb"
| 155 || September 21 || @ Pirates || FSO || L 2–4 || Burnett (9–11) || Bailey (11–11) || Grilli (31) || 39,425 || 88–67 || 
|- style="text-align:center; background:#bfb"
| 156 || September 22 || @ Pirates || FSO || W 11–3 || Arroyo (14–11) || Locke (10–7) || || 38,699 || 89–67 || 
|- style="text-align:center; background:#bfb"
| 157 || September 23 || Mets || FSO || W 3–2 (10) || Parra (2–3) || Burke (0–3) || || 21,269 || 90–67 || 
|- style="text-align:center; background:#fbb"
| 158 || September 24 || Mets || FSO || L 2–4 || Niese (8–8) || Leake (14–7) || Black (1) || 28,887 || 90–68 || 
|- style="text-align:center; background:#fbb"
| 159 || September 25 || Mets ||  || L 0–1 || Matsuzaka (3–3) || Latos (14–7) || Hawkins (13) || 26,223 || 90–69 || 
|- style="text-align:center; background:#fbb"
| 160 || September 27 || Pirates || FSO || L 1–4 || Burnett (10–11) || Bailey (11–12) || Grilli (33) || 40,107 || 90–70 || 
|- style="text-align:center; background:#fbb"
| 161 || September 28 || Pirates || FSO || L 3–8 || Mazzaro (8–2) || Arroyo (14–12) || || 40,707 || 90–71 || 
|- style="text-align:center; background:#fbb"
| 162 || September 29 || Pirates || FSO || L 2–4 || Cumpton (2–1) || Reynolds (1–3) || Farnsworth (2) || 40,142 || 90–72 || 
|-

|

Roster

Opening day lineup

Postseason

Wild Card Game

Wild Card, October 1
8:07 p.m. (EDT) at PNC Park in Pittsburgh, Pennsylvania

Player statistics
Stats through: September 29, 2013
Batting
Note: G = Games played; AB = At bats; R = Runs scored; H = Hits; 2B Doubles; 3B = Triples; HR = Home runs; RBI = Runs batted in; AVG = Batting average; SB = Stolen bases

 – Qualified for batting title (3.1 plate appearances per team game)
Pitching
Note: W = Wins; L = Losses; ERA = Earned run average; G = Games pitched; GS = Games started; SV = Saves; IP = Innings pitched; ER = Earned runs allowed; BB = Walks allowed; K = Strikeouts

 – Qualified for ERA title (1 inning pitched per team game)
Legend
* not on active roster
† on 15-day disabled list
†† on 60-day disabled list

Farm System

Minor League Standings
Standings through: End of Season

† First Half
†† Second Half

2013 Minor League Notes

The Pensacola Blue Wahoos (Double-A) finished their first half with a record of 25–44, good for last place in the Southern League's southern division, 14 games back of the Mobile BayBears. 
The Bakersfield Blaze (High A) finished their first half with a record of 29–41, good for last place in the California League's northern division, 14 games back of the San Jose Giants. 
The Dayton Dragons (Low A) finished their first half with a record of 28–41, good for 6th place in the Midwest League's eastern division, 16 games back of the South Bend Silver Hawks.

Honors and awards
All Stars:
Joey Votto (4th selection)
Brandon Phillips (3rd selection)
Aroldis Chapman (2nd selection)

Notes

References

External links

 Official Website
 2013 Cincinnati Reds at Baseball Reference 

Cincinnati Reds seasons
Cincinnati Reds
Cinc